The Shafik Cabinet was led by prime minister of Egypt Ahmed Shafik from 31 January 2011 to 3 March 2011.

List of members

References

Cabinets of Egypt
2011 establishments in Egypt
2011 disestablishments in Egypt
Cabinets established in 2011
Cabinets disestablished in 2011